The ocellated sand-eel (Lamnostoma polyophthalma)  is an eel in the family Ophichthidae (worm/snake eels). It was described by Pieter Bleeker in 1853.

References

Ophichthidae
Fish described in 1853